Mariusz Ujek (born 6 December 1977 in Lubin) is a Polish former footballer.

Career

Club
He signed a one-year contract with Polonia Bytom on 27 August 2010. He was released from Polonia on 1 February 2011.

In July 2011, he joined Warta Poznań.

References

External links
 

1977 births
Living people
Polish footballers
People from Lubin
Sportspeople from Lower Silesian Voivodeship
Zagłębie Lubin players
Chrobry Głogów players
RKS Radomsko players
Górnik Polkowice players
Odra Opole players
Zagłębie Sosnowiec players
GKS Bełchatów players
Polonia Bytom players
Warta Poznań players
Polonia Warsaw players
Ekstraklasa players
Association football forwards